Ağılönü is a village the central district (Karaman) of Karaman Province, Turkey. At  it is situated to the east of Karaman and to the South of Turkish state highway  which connects Karaman to east. The population is of Ağılönü is 307. as of 2011. Major economic activities of the village are agriculture and animal breeding..

References

Villages in Karaman Central District